Mathiassen Mountain is a mountain summit, the tallest on Southampton Island, in the Canadian territory of Nunavut.

References

Mountains of Kivalliq Region
Mountains of Canada under 1000 metres